Walking on Thin Ice is a greatest-hits compilation of Yoko Ono's work from 1971-85. It was released by Rykodisc in 1992, along with the more comprehensive 6-disc Onobox set. The booklet includes an essay by Ono, pieces from her book Grapefruit, and quotes about her from artists such as David Bowie, Eric Clapton and Cyndi Lauper.

Track listing

References

Yoko Ono albums
1992 greatest hits albums
Rykodisc compilation albums
Albums produced by Yoko Ono